The Polish Legion in Turkey was a military force formed in Istanbul by emigrants from Partitioned Poland to fight with the Ottoman Army in the Russo-Turkish War that lasted from 1877 to 1878. At the beginning of the nineteenth century the unit consisted of around 20,000 troops.

It was divided into two branches: European and Asian. The European branch, with about 70 people under the command of Józef Jagmin, became part of the division under Salha Pasha. On August 23, 1877, it took part in the Battle of Kizlarz, where many legionnaires died including Jagmin. The Asian division fought on the Caucasian front.

References 

Russo-Turkish War (1877–1878)
Expatriate units and formations of Poland
Military units and formations of the Ottoman Empire
Poland–Turkey relations